Dohnovan West (born May 19, 2001) is an American football center for the Vegas Vipers of the XFL. He played college football at Arizona State.

Early life and high school
West grew up in Mission Hills, California and attended Bishop Alemany High School.

College career
West was a member of the Arizona State Sun Devils for three seasons. He was named Arizona State's starting center during his freshman season. West was named second-team All-Pac-12 Conference as a junior. Following the end of the season, West announced that he would be forgoing his remaining collegiate eligibility and enter the 2022 NFL Draft.

Professional career

San Francisco 49ers
West signed with the San Francisco 49ers as an undrafted free agent on May 2, 2022. He was waived on August 29, 2022.

Vegas Vipers
West was selected by the Vegas Vipers in the 2023 XFL Draft.

References

External links
Arizona State Sun Devils bio

2001 births
Living people
American football centers
Arizona State Sun Devils football players
People from Mission Hills, Los Angeles
Players of American football from Los Angeles
San Francisco 49ers players
Vegas Vipers players